El Centro de Estudios Judíos “Torat Emet” is a Spanish-language Jewish education and spirituality center for Jews from all over Latin America. Its mission is to provide traditional Sephardic Torah study using the traditional perspectives of the Spanish and Portuguese communities customs and rites in Spanish for Latin American audiences. Much of the work of the center focuses on the return of the Anusim - descendants of the Spanish and Portuguese Jews that were forcibly converted to Christianity during the Spanish and Portuguese Inquisitions. The center provides education via weekly classes and special events held either via the web from it virtual Bet Midrash (house of study) and/or in person at its various locations throughout the United States and Latin America.

El Centro was founded in January 2000 in the Bronx NY by Rabbi Rigoberto Emmanuel ("Manny") Viñas who continues to be its Executive Director and primary leader. It is based out of the Yonkers New York area and has outreach centers in Miami, Puerto Rico, the Dominican Republic. Honduras. Spain and Mexico. Students participate in events from 15 different countries. Rabbi Viñas' Facebook has over 15000 affiliates. The center also has a YouTube Channel called Tora Tropical Judaismo con Sabor Latino (Judaism with a Latin Flavor) with hundreds of hours of classes in Spanish that feature Jewish Theology, Jewish law and application of the minhagim of the Spanish speaking sefardim, History and Zionism among many other topics.

The center began its operations at the Hebrew Institute of Riverdale in the Bronx, and received a grant from UJA Federation's COJIR. It then later moved its base of operations to the Yonkers-based Lincoln Park Jewish Center, until 2017. At present, the weekly classes and events are no longer held at that location and Rabbi Viñas is no longer affiliated with the Lincoln Park Jewish Center. El Centro continues having monthly events and holiday celebrations in the Yonkers NY area as an independent 501(c)3 religious organization. Its weekly classes are held in various centers throughout the world and broadcast via Facebook on Rabbi Viñas' very popular page listed below.

The center has opened a synagogue and Bet Midrash based in Miami, Florida, that is headed by Rabbi Benjamin Viñas Rabbi Manny's brother. Rabbi Manny Viñas has continued this period of growth for the organization by launching centers in Latin American countries in an effort to strengthen the communities of Anusim, who seek to return to Judaism and have a local community to call their own. This has garnered grassroots support throughout the Americas. During one such visit (June 2018) to the Dominican Republic at a lecture that attracted hundreds of followers, Rabbii Viñas was proclaimed by the leadership of the Sephardic Community as "the Father of the Anusim" for his love and dedication to the return of the Anusim to the ways of the ancestors and his relentless pursuit of education that will restore the Anusim to SEPHARDIC practice.

Tora Tropical
Tora Tropical is a Jewish bi-monthly newspaper sponsored by El Centro de Estudios Torat Emet. The first issue of Tora Tropical was published in 2004 under the Direction of Rabbi Rigoberto Emmanuel ("Manny") Viñas.
Rabbi Viñas' classes can be seen on his Facebook page and on his YouTube Channel 'Torá Tropical.' There are hundreds of topics from history, to Zionism and Sefardic laws and customs, with over a million downloads. His students span the globe. His work attracts a large Anusim population.

References

External links
Centro de Estudios Judios Torat Emet
https://www.facebook.com/RabbiVinasEnglish/
Toratropical.com
https://www.facebook.com/pg/RabinoVinas/posts/

Education in Yonkers, New York
Hispanic and Latino American culture in New York (state)
Hispanic and Latino-Jewish culture in the United States
Jewish educational organizations
Jews and Judaism in Westchester County, New York
Sephardi Jewish culture in New York (state)
Spanish-American culture in New York (state)